Paul Hugh Clitheroe AM (born 7 July 1955 in Nottingham, England, UK) is an Australian television presenter, radio presenter, financial analyst, financial advisor and publisher.

Career
Clitheroe graduated from the University of NSW in the late 1970s, with a Bachelor of Arts.

With financing from his father for his share of a new business venture, Clitheroe and some university friends founded investment research and advisory company, Ipac Securities Limited, in 1983.

He is best known for his stint as the host of Nine Network show Money, a financial and investment program that aired from 1993 to 2002, and has also appeared as occasional specials, the latest in 2006.

Clitheroe occasionally appears on Tony Delroy's Nightlife on ABC radio and also on Thursdays on 2UE Money Clinic.

In addition to this, Clitheroe has written for numerous financial publications as well as in Melbourne newspaper the Herald Sun. He was president of the Financial Planning Association of Australia for 1993–94.

Clitheroe has been an active advocate of financial literacy for many years. He is Chairman of the Australian Government Financial Literacy Board and Financial Literacy Australia. Clitheroe is the Chairman of InvestSMART Group Limited, and is also Chairman and chief commentator of Money magazine.

Books
Financial Snakes and Ladders: How to Survive and Thrive in Tough Times (2001). 
Making Money: The Keys to Financial Success (2009). 
and more

References

External links
Official Money Website
ipac History

1955 births
Living people
Australian television presenters
Australian financial analysts
People from Sydney
Members of the Order of Australia
University of New South Wales alumni